Visa requirements for Israeli citizens refers to regulations pertaining to visas for holders of Israeli passports. As of 11 January 2022, Israeli citizens had visa-free or visa on arrival access to 159 countries and territories, ranking the Israeli passport 24th in terms of travel freedom according to the Global Passport Index 2021.

Abraham Accords Peace Agreements helped the Israeli passport jump 13 places in rankings to 13th place in August 2021.

History
According to Israeli law, Lebanon, Syria, Saudi Arabia, Iraq, Yemen and Iran are designated as enemy countries and an Israeli citizen must obtain a special permit from the Israeli Ministry of the Interior to visit these countries. An Israeli who visits these countries, whether with a foreign or an Israeli passport, may be prosecuted when coming back to Israel, however prosecution is rare. This list was set in 1954, and was updated on 25 July 2007 to include Iran. Egypt and Jordan remained on the "enemy countries" list; however, the Israeli Ministry of the Interior had issued a general unlimited permit to visit these countries, following the peace treaty signed by Israel with each country, hence voiding the law in respect to each country. Under an Israeli military order, Israeli citizens except for security personnel carrying out operations are prohibited from entering the Gaza Strip, which is ruled by Hamas, and Area A of the West Bank, where the Palestinian Authority exercises full civil and security control.

In addition to these countries, there are other countries that prohibit entry to Israeli passport holders, after joining the Arab boycott of the State of Israel, including Malaysia, Brunei, Pakistan, and Bangladesh.

Some controversial rejections of Israeli nationals include tennis player Shahar Pe'er who was denied a visa to the United Arab Emirates which would have allowed her to play in the 2009 Dubai Open. However, later she was allowed. Furthermore, Israeli judo athletes and ministers have been allowed into the UAE more recently. This was prior to signing the 2020 Abraham Accords.

People who make aliyah to Israel are now eligible to receive an Israeli passport without waiting period after their arrival at Israel.

Recent diplomatic relations
As of 21 February 2021, Israel has signed six peace treaties with Arab countries. 

Following the Egypt–Israel peace treaty in 1979, and the Israel–Jordan peace treaty in 1994, more countries have signed peace treaties with Israel.

On 15 September 2020, Israel and the UAE established diplomatic relations in Washington DC, and signed a peace agreement, which removed all restrictions on Israeli citizens' travel to the UAE.

On 15 September 2020, Israel and Bahrain established diplomatic relations in Washington DC, and signed the Bahrain–Israel normalization agreement, which removed all restrictions on Israeli citizens' travel to Bahrain.

On 23 October 2020 an agreement took place between Sudan and Israel with the mediation of the United States involving the recognition of the state of Israel by Sudan and the establishment of full diplomatic relations.

On 10 December 2020, Donald Trump announced that Israel and Morocco agreed to establish full diplomatic relations, while also announcing that the United States recognized Morocco's claim over Western Sahara.

On 12 December 2020, Israel and Bhutan formally established full diplomatic relations.

On 1 February 2021, Israel and Kosovo established full diplomatic relations over Zoom, and established a Kosovan embassy in Jerusalem.

As of June 2022, Saudi Arabia and Israel are holding talks as a precursor to establishing formal diplomatic relations. Saudi officials say it's a question of when, not if.

In 2021, Bangladesh removed ban of Israeli passports.

In 2023, Israel nationals could be exempted of visa application to travel to the USA as the country fits the security levels of US immigration (% of denied applications).

Visa requirements map

Visa requirements 
Visa requirements for holders of normal passports traveling for tourist purposes:

Entry conditions may vary because of COVID-19 travel restrictions.

Pre-approved visas pick-up
Pre-approved visas can be picked up on arrival in the following countries instead in embassy or consulate.

Unrecognised or partially recognised countries

Dependent and autonomous territories

Consular protection of Israeli citizens abroad

There are 70 resident embassies, 23 consulates and five "special" missions in the 159 states that recognise Israel.

As of 2014, Germany offers consular assistance to Israelis in countries without Israelis representation.

Canada offers consular assistance to Israelis in Cuba.

North Korea does not recognise Israel, denouncing it as an "imperialist satellite". 
Since 2016, Israeli civilians have been permitted to travel to North Korea without intermediaries, with appropriate visas available in Israel.

Arab–Israeli conflict
Due to ongoing conflict with Arab nations, 13 Arab members of the United Nations do not recognize the State of Israel: Algeria, Comoros, Djibouti, Iraq, Kuwait, Lebanon, Libya, Qatar, Saudi Arabia, Somalia, Syria, Tunisia, and Yemen. Israeli citizens need special approval from the Ministry of Interior to visit most of these countries.

See also

 Israeli identity card
 List of nationalities forbidden at border
 Visa policy of Israel
 Who is a Jew?

References and Notes
References

Notes

Israel
Foreign relations of Israel